The street names of George Town reflect the multicultural heritage of the city, the capital of the former British settlement of Penang, now part of Malaysia.

Most streets in the city were built and named during the colonial era, and the historic English names generally remain and are still used by most Penangites. Since the passage of the National Language Act 1967, government policy has been to use the Malay language for all official purposes, and the Malay translations of the street names are the primary official versions that are used on street signs, now supplemented with names in English (and, in some places, Chinese, Tamil and Arabic).

Changes in street names 
Since independence, there have been some changes to the official names of some streets. On the whole, however, like Singapore and unlike many other cities in Malaysia, George Town has retained most of its colonial street names, although they used to be indicated on street signs only in their Malay translations.

Until 2007, street signs in George Town were only written in Malay, as a result of the national language policy. Unfortunately, this had the effect of confusing tourists, who found it difficult to match the English names commonly used by Penangites with the Malay names on street signs which were often very different. In the case of proper nouns, the English name is easily recognisable, e.g. Kimberley Street is Lebuh Kimberley. In other cases, however, the Malay translation may be unfamiliar to those who do not speak the language, e.g. Church St is literally translated as Lebuh Gereja (from the Portuguese igreja). A few streets have been given completely new names in Malay.

Even where official street names have changed, the local population have largely continued informally to use the old names when referring to streets. This is partly because the new names are often unwieldy (e.g. Green Lane vs Jalan Masjid Negeri, Pitt Street vs Jalan Masjid Kapitan Keling, or Northam Road vs Jalan Sultan Ahmad Shah), but also reflects a strong conservatism in the local population, who see Penang's colonial history as part of their local identity. When Scott Road was renamed Jalan D S Ramanathan, after the first Mayor of the City of George Town, the new street signs were repeatedly defaced and had to be replaced several times, eventually forcing the city authorities to fix a replacement street sign fifteen feet up a lamppost (instead of at waist-height, as was then usual).

Street sign design 

The oldest street signs in the centre of George Town are rectangular and made of painted metal plate (blue with white lettering), usually affixed to corner shop-houses at the top of the ground floor, and many can still be seen. In the suburbs, rectangular cast-iron signs with indented corners (white with black lettering and edging) in English and sometimes Jawi script, fixed at head-height to a black iron pole surmounted with a finial, could also be seen. Almost all of these have been replaced by the modern road signs.

By 2007, rectangular reflective road signs (green with white lettering) in the Malay Rumi script had largely replaced the older signs. These were initially at waist-height, fixed to two black metal supports, and subsequently at head-height, fixed to a single black metal support. These signs also indicated the postal town and postcode.

Since 2007, new bilingual reflective street signs based on the old suburban signs have started to replace the Malay-only street signs. These are partly based on the old white signs, and are rectangular with indented corners (green with white lettering) and mounted at head-height to a black iron pole surmounted with an onion dome. The street name is given in Malay and English, together with the town and postcode.

In June 2007, while Penang was under the rule of Gerakan, street signs in Chinese were illegally set up by Penang's Democratic Action Party (DAP) Socialist Youth division along several roads in George Town under the justification it helps attract tourists from China, only to be removed by the Penang Municipal Council.

On July 22, 2008, following DAP's electoral victory in Penang and George Town's entry into UNESCO's World Heritage Site list, Gerakan was reported to have placed Chinese-language on existing street signs at six roads, claiming the signs were now vital with George Town's recognition by UNESCO and serve as a reminder to DAP of its earlier promises to erect such signs if voted into office. DAP Socialist Youth National Organizing secretary Koay Teng Hai had also proposed to include Tamil and Jawi translations, depending on the cultural background of the area, along with Chinese street names.

Despite opposition from Malay political parties and individuals at state and federal levels, the bilingual street signs with Chinese, Arabic and Tamil names were put up in November 2008. These multilingual road signs remain in use to this day.

Standard translations 
In translating the English words for street, road, lane, etc., the city authorities follow a fairly regular system to avoid confusion between many streets of similar names. There are exceptions to this rule where the historic Malay usage is different and there is no chance of confusion, e.g. Hutton Lane has always been known as Jalan Hutton (see e.g. the Mesjid Jalan Hatin (mosque) there) rather than *Lorong Hutton.

Avenue - Lebuhraya (e.g. Peel Avenue/Lebuhraya Peel; context usually prevents confusion with the normal meaning of lebuhraya, viz. highway/expressway)
Circus - Lilitan (e.g. Hargreaves Circus/Lilitan Hargreaves)
Close - Solok (e.g. Scott Close/Solok Scott)
Court - Halaman (e.g. Cantonment Court/Halaman Cantonment)
Crescent - Lengkok (e.g. Jesselton Crescent/Lengkok Jesselton)
Cross - Lintang (e.g. Burmah Cross/Lintang Burma)
Drive - Persiaran (e.g. Gurney Drive/Pesiaran Gurney)
Gardens - Taman (e.g. Western Gardens/Taman Western)
Lane - Lorong (e.g. Prangin Lane/Lorong Perangin)
Place - Pesara (e.g. Claimant Place/Pesara Claimant)
Quay - Pengkalan (e.g. Weld Quay/Pengkalan Weld)
Road - Jalan (e.g. Perak Road/Jalan Perak)
Square - Medan (e.g. College Square/Medan Maktab; also used for some new square-shaped roads that are not open squares, e.g. York Square/Medan York)
Street - Lebuh (e.g. Campbell Street/Lebuh Campbell)
Street Ghaut - Gat Lebuh (e.g. China Street Ghaut/Gat Lebuh China)
Terrace - Tingkat (e.g. Erskine Terrace/Tingkat Erskine)

The word "Ghaut" at the end of some street names reflects the fact that they are extensions of the original streets beyond the original waterfront at Beach St with the reclamation of the Ghauts and the construction of Weld Quay, ghat being a Hindi and Bengali word meaning a flight of steps leading down to a body of water.

List of street names 
This list is by no means exhaustive. Road name changes (as opposed to translations) are marked in green.

Districts in George Town

Suburban roads

See also 
 List of roads in Kuala Lumpur

References 

 City Council of George Town, Penang Past and Present 1786-1963: A Historical Account of the City of George Town since 1786, Penang: 1966.
 Khoo Su Nin, Streets of George Town Penang (4th ed.), Penang: 2007, 
 Lo Man Yuk, Chinese Names of Streets in Penang, Journal of the Straits Branch of the Royal Asiatic Society, Singapore: January 1900.
 S Durai Raja Singam, Malayan Place Names, 1938.
 The Penang File

Notes

External links 

Bilingual list of Penang street names including Hokkien and Cantonese names (incomplete): A, B, C, D
List of George Town streets' Chinese Name by Penang Press Club
WikiMapia's satellite/hybrid view of George Town streets

Roads in Penang
George Town, Penang
George Town